Mnemonics are used to help memorize the electronic color codes for resistors.  Mnemonics describing specific and relatable scenarios are more memorable than abstract phrases.

Resistor color code

The first letter of the color code is matched by order of increasing magnitude. The electronic color codes, in order, are:
 0 = Black
 1 = Brown
 2 = Red
 3 = Orange
 4 = Yellow
 5 = Green
 6 = Blue
 7 = Violet
 8 = Gray
 9 = White.

Easy to remember
A mnemonic which includes color name(s) generally reduces the chances of confusing black and brown. Some mnemonics that are easy to remember:

Big Boys Race Our Young Girls But Violet Generally Wins.

 Better Be Right Or Your Great Big Venture Goes West.

 Beetle Bailey Runs Over Your General Before Very Good Witnesses.

 Beach Bums Rarely Offer You Gatorade But Very Good Water.

 Buster Brown Races Our Young Girls But Violet Generally Wins.

 Better Be Right Or Your Great Big Vacation Goes Wrong. 

 Better Be Right Or Your Great Big Values Go Wrong. 

 Better Be Right Or Your Great Big Plan Goes Wrong. (with P = Purple for Violet)

 Back-Breaking Rascals Often Yield Grudgingly But Virtuous Gentlemen Will Give Shelter Nobly. (with tolerance bands Gold, Silver or None)

 Better Be Right Or Your Great Big Plan Goes Wrong - Go Start Now!

 Black Beetles Running Over Your Garden Bring Very Grey Weather.

 Bad Booze Rots Our Young Guts But Vodka Goes Well – get some now.

 Bad Boys Run Over Yellow Gardenias Behind Victory Garden Walls. 

 Bat Brained Resistor Order You Gotta Be Very Good With.

 Betty Brown Runs Over Your Garden But Violet Gingerly Walks.

 Big Beautiful Roses Occupy Your Garden But Violets Grow Wild.

 Big Brown Rabbits Often Yield Great Big Vocal Groans When Gingerly Slapped Needlessly.

 Black Bananas Really Offend Your Girlfriend But Violets Get Welcomed.

 Black Birds Run Over Your Gay Barely Visible Grey Worms.

 Badly Burnt Resistors On Your Ground Bus Void General Warranty.

 Billy Brown Ran Out Yelling Get Back Violets Getting Wet.

 Better Be Right Or You're Gonna Be Violently Gouged With Golden Spaghetti.

 Bright Boys Rave Over Young Girls But Veto Getting Wed.

 Black Bears Raid Our Yellow Green Bins Violently Grabbing Whatever Goodies Smell Nice.

 Bad Bears Raid Our Yummy Grub But Veto Grey Waffles.

 Bachelor Boys Rush Our Young Girls But Veronica Goes Wild for Gold or Silver Necklaces.

Canada 
A mnemonic that is taught in classrooms in Canada:

 Black Bears Roam Our Yukon Grounds But Vanish in Gray Winter.

India 
A mnemonic that is commonly taught in classrooms in India:

 B B ROY of Great Britain had a Very Good Wife who wore Gold and Silver Necklace.
 Bill Brown Realized Only Yesterday Good Boys Value Good Work.

UK 
Mnemonics commonly taught in UK engineering courses include:

 Bye Bye Rosie Off You Go to Birmingham Via Great Western.
 Bye Bye Rosie Off You Go to Bristol Via Great Western.
 Bye Bye Rosie Off You Go to Become a Very Good Wife.
 Bill Brown Realized Only Yesterday Good Boys Value Good Work.

Dutch 

This mnemonic is commonly taught in the Netherlands:

 Zij Bracht Rozen Op Gerrits Graf Bij Vies Grijs Weer (she brought roses onto Gerrit's grave in dirty grey weather)

Vacuum tube era
Popular in the days of vacuum-tube radios:

 Better Buy Resistors Or Your Grid Bias Voltages Go West. ("go west" means die)

Offensive/outdated
The following historical mnemonics are generally considered offensive/outdated and should not be used in current electronics training:
 Bad boys rape our young girls but Violet gives willingly. (Get Some Now (refers to the tolerance bands Gold, Silver or None))
 Bad boys run our young girls behind victory garden walls.
 Batman blows Robin on yon Gotham bridge; Vows Gordon's next.
 Batman blows Robin on yon Gotham bridge; Very good Wayne! Get Superman Next!
 Big boys rape our young girls but Violet goes willingly.
 Black boys rape our young girls because virgins go wild.
 Black boys rape our young girls behind victory garden walls.
 Black boys ride our young girls but virgins go without.
 Black boy raped our young girl, bam, virginity gone west.
BaBy ROY of Great Britain is Very Gay With Gold & Silver Necklace.

Casual use in an engineering class has been cited as evidence of the sexism faced by women in scientific fields.  Latanya Arvette Sweeney, Associate Professor of Computer Science at Carnegie Mellon, mentions yet another as one reason why she felt alienated and eventually dropped out of MIT in the 1980s to form her own software company.  In 2011, a teacher in the UK was reprimanded by the General Teaching Council for alluding to and partial use of yet another.

References

Technology-related lists
Mnemonics
Resistive components
Electronic color code mnemonics